Telegraph Peak, is a peak of the San Gabriel Mountains, in the San Gabriel Mountains National Monument and San Bernardino County, California.

See also

References

San Gabriel Mountains
Mountains of San Bernardino County, California
San Gabriel Mountains National Monument
San Bernardino National Forest
Mountains of Southern California